Elachista litharga is a moth of the family Elachistidae. It is found in Australia, where it has been recorded from lowland areas in Tasmania.

References

Moths described in 2011
litharga
Moths of Australia